Portal: No Escape is a short fan film based on the Portal video game series directed by Dan Trachtenberg. The film was released on August 23, 2011. As of July 2022, the video has received over 27 million views.

Plot
Chell (Danielle Rayne) wakes up in a room with no memory of who she is or how she got there. She notices something on the back of her neck. Using a piece of a mirror she has just broken, she discovers that it is a bar code. Seemingly concerned, she also spots mysterious tally marks drawn on a wall. Chell spends the following hours, or even days, decoding the graph in her mind, exercising, and eating food provided by the guards, while being observed by a security camera. Soon, she discovers the meaning of the scribblings, and finds a Portal Gun hidden behind a wall panel. Chell learns how to use the device, and when an officer comes to intervene, she drops her bed on him, and escapes. She manages to run away from the chasers, finding herself on a roof of a building, in an industrial area, and uses the flinging technique to jump to another building. While walking away from the officers, Chell realizes that she is in fact surrounded by giant screens that give an illusion of an open world.

Production
In an interview with the Los Angeles Times, Trachtenberg said that the film was produced on a few thousand dollars. Additionally, according to Trachtenberg's tweets on Twitter, the film wrapped up production in early 2010; it took an additional year and a half to complete post-production.

Reception
The film was well received upon its release. On its first day, the video had reached 800,000 views. The video was later featured on VentureBeat's "Top 10 Best Gaming Videos of 2011" list. The film was so well received that New Line Cinema initially approached Trachtenberg to direct the film adaptation of Y: The Last Man. Trachtenberg also states that Bad Robot has become interested in him since the release of Portal: No Escape, but had been pitching other ideas along with his other film work; when Bad Robot presented him with the opportunity to direct 10 Cloverfield Lane, he saw similarities between it and Portal: No Escape, particularly on the opening featuring a woman in captivity with no idea how she got there, and was attracted to the project.

References

External links
 
 

2011 action films
Fan films
Live-action films based on video games
Portal (series)
2011 short films
2011 films
2010s English-language films
Films directed by Dan Trachtenberg
American science fiction short films
2010s American films